Vyacheslav Vasylovych Zahorodnyuk (born 11 August 1972) is a Ukrainian former competitive figure skater. He represented the USSR until its dissolution and then represented Ukraine. He is the 1994 World bronze medalist, 1996 European champion, and 1989 World Junior champion.

Personal life 
Zahorodnyuk was born on 11 August 1972 in Odessa, Ukrainian SSR. He married Ukrainian ice dancer Olga Mudrak in 1994. They have a son, Maxim (born August 2005), and a daughter, Alina (born in February 2009).

Career 
Zahorodnyuk was initially coached by Galina Zmievskaya. Competing for the Soviet Union, he won the 1989 World Junior Championships.

After placing sixth at the 1991 Skate America, Zahorodnyuk won silver medals at the 1991 Grand Prix International de Paris and 1991 NHK Trophy, still representing the Soviet Union. In January 1992, he competed for the Commonwealth of Independent States (CIS) at the European Championships in Lausanne, where he finished fourth. In February, he placed eighth for the Unified Team at the 1992 Winter Olympics in Albertville, France. He was tenth at the 1992 World Championships for the CIS.

Zahorodnyuk began competing under the Ukrainian flag in the 1992–93 season. He won bronze at the 1994 World Championships and gold at the 1996 European Championships.

In his final competitive season, Zahorodnyuk placed seventh at the 1998 European Championships and then tenth at the 1998 Winter Olympics in Nagano, Japan. He ended his career with a fourth-place result at the 1998 World Championships. He was coached by Valentyn Nikolayev in Richmond, Virginia.

After retiring from competition in April 1998, Zahorodnyuk participated in some film and TV productions, including The Christmas Angel: A Story on Ice and worked as a coach in Richmond, Virginia. He coached in Kyiv in 2011. As of May 2016, he is based in Irvine, California.

Programs

Results
 Zahorodnyuk represented the Soviet Union until December 1991; the Commonwealth of Independent States (CIS) at the 1992 European and World Championships; the Unified Team at the 1992 Olympics; and Ukraine from the start of the 1992–93 season.
 GP: Champions Series (Grand Prix)

References

Navigation

1972 births
Living people
Sportspeople from Odesa
Ukrainian male single skaters
Soviet male single skaters
Ukrainian emigrants to the United States
Ukrainian figure skating coaches
Olympic figure skaters of the Unified Team
Olympic figure skaters of Ukraine
Figure skaters at the 1992 Winter Olympics
Figure skaters at the 1998 Winter Olympics
World Figure Skating Championships medalists
European Figure Skating Championships medalists
World Junior Figure Skating Championships medalists
Competitors at the 1994 Goodwill Games
K. D. Ushinsky South Ukrainian National Pedagogical University alumni